George Bukator (April 24, 1913 – May 2, 1987) was a Canadian politician and Ontario political figure. He represented Niagara Falls in the Legislative Assembly of Ontario from 1958 to 1971 as a Liberal member.

He served with the Niagara Parks Commission for six years. He was also reeve of Chippawa from 1949 to 1958 and warden for Welland County in 1951. Bukator was the nineteenth mayor of Niagara Falls from 1973 to 1978. He died in hospital at Niagara Falls.

A park on the Welland River was named in his honour.

References

External links 
 

1913 births
1987 deaths
Mayors of Niagara Falls, Ontario
Ontario Liberal Party MPPs
People from Lachine, Quebec
Politicians from Montreal